Liberty High School (LHS) is a four-year public high school in northern Colorado Springs, Colorado, and part of Academy School District 20. It opened in 1987, and in the 2017–18 year, it had an enrollment of 1,650.

Achievements
LHS is a member of the College Board and the National Association of College Admission Counseling, and is accredited by the North Central Association of Secondary Schools.

Advanced courses available include college preparatory courses, International Baccalaureate, and opportunities for Advanced Placement.

References

External links 
 

High schools in Colorado Springs, Colorado
Educational institutions established in 1987
Public high schools in Colorado
1987 establishments in Colorado